Danger Valley is a 1937 American Western film released by Monogram Pictures, directed by Robert N. Bradbury, written by Robert Emmett Tansey (as "Robert Emmett") and starring Addison Randall (credited as "Jack Randall") as a singing cowboy.

Cast
Addison Randall as Jack Bruce
Lois Wilde as Mickey Temple
Hal Price as Sidekick Lucky
Charles King as Dana
Earl Dwire as Hardrock
Ernie Adams as Soapy
Jimmy Aubrey as Australia
Ed Brady as Jake Reed
Frank LaRue as Pappy Temple
Chick Hannon as Joe
Helen Gibson as Nana Temple
Merrill McCormick as Henchman

Soundtrack
Addison Randall - "On the Wide Open Plains" (Written by Johnny Lange and Fred Stryker)
Addison Randall - "Little Tenderfoot" (Written by Johnny Lange and Fred Stryker)

External links

1937 films
1937 Western (genre) films
1930s English-language films
American black-and-white films
Monogram Pictures films
American Western (genre) films
Films directed by Robert N. Bradbury
1930s American films